The evil bit is a fictional IPv4 packet header field proposed in RFC 3514, a humorous April Fools' Day RFC from 2003 authored by Steve Bellovin. The RFC recommended that the last remaining unused bit, the "Reserved Bit" in the IPv4 packet header, be used to indicate whether a packet had been sent with malicious intent, thus making computer security engineering an easy problem simply ignore any messages with the evil bit set and trust the rest.

Influence 
The evil bit has become a synonym for all attempts to seek simple technical solutions for difficult human social problems which require the willing participation of malicious actors, in particular efforts to implement Internet censorship using simple technical solutions.

As a joke, FreeBSD implemented support for the evil bit that day but removed the changes the next day. A Linux patch implementing the iptables module "ipt_evil" was posted the next year. Furthermore, a patch for FreeBSD 7 is available and is kept up-to-date.

There is extension for XMPP protocol "XEP-0076: Malicious Stanzas", inspired by evil bit.

This RFC has also been quoted in the otherwise completely serious RFC 3675, ".sex Considered Dangerous", which may have caused the proponents of .xxx to wonder whether the Internet Engineering Task Force (IETF) was commenting on their application for a top-level domain (TLD) the document was not related to their application.

For April Fool's 2010, Google added an &evil=true parameter to requests through the Ajax APIs.

See also 
 Technological fix
 Do Not Track
 HTTP 451

References 

2003 in computing
April Fools' Day jokes
Computer network security
Computer humor
Censorship
2003 hoaxes